Cargo is a small town located in Cabonne Shire, New South Wales that is 35 kilometres southwest of Orange, Australia.

References

Towns in New South Wales
Cabonne Council